As initially planned, The Twentieth Century Encyclopedia of Catholicism was to include 13 books in the section covering Catholicism and the Arts. The original selection of book titles to be encompassed within this section is shown in the table below:

The size of this section was reduced to 6 volumes. The titles of all of the sections of the encyclopedia as-published are listed within the main page for The Twentieth Century Encyclopedia of Catholicism

References

Christian encyclopedias